Old Parsonage is a historic church parsonage on Buckwheat Bridge Road in Clermont, Columbia County, New York.  It was constructed in 1867 and is a two-story, three bay frame residence with a jerkinhead metal roof.  It features a decorative sawn bargeboard in a picturesque cottage style.  Also on the property are a garage and small well house.

It was listed on the National Register of Historic Places in 1983.

References

Houses on the National Register of Historic Places in New York (state)
Properties of religious function on the National Register of Historic Places in New York (state)
Religious buildings and structures completed in 1867
Houses in Columbia County, New York
Clergy houses in the United States
National Register of Historic Places in Columbia County, New York